The 1999–2000 Alpha Ethniki was the 64th season of the highest football league of Greece. The season began on 19 September 1999 and ended on 28 May 2000. Olympiacos won their fourth consecutive and 29th Greek title.

Teams

Stadia and personnel

 1 On final match day of the season, played on 28 May 2000.

League table

Results

UEFA Cup Places

AEK Athens qualified through the Cup, the 3rd league UEFA Cup place is decided between the teams within 5 points from 6th to 8th place.

UEFA Cup Play-off

Iraklis with two Home-matches, Aris one, Panionios none

|}

Top scorers

External links
Official Greek FA Site
RSSSF
Greek SuperLeague official Site
SuperLeague Statistics

Alpha Ethniki seasons
Greece
1